The Raymond C. Moore Medal for Paleontology is awarded by the Society for Sedimentary Geology to persons who have made significant contributions in the field which have promoted the science of stratigraphy by research in paleontology and evolution and the use of fossils for interpretations of paleoecology. The award is named after Professor Raymond C. Moore, the American paleontogist who helped to found the society.

Prizewinners
Source: Society for Sedimentary Geology

See also

 List of paleontology awards
 Prizes named after people

References

Paleontology awards
American awards
Awards established in 1980
1980 establishments in the United States